Count William Wirich of Daun-Falkenstein (1 June 1613 – 26 August 1682) was a German nobleman.  By descent, he was a Count of Falkenstein; by inheritance, he was Lord of Broich and Bürgel.

Life 
William Wirich was a son of Count John Adolph (1582–1623) and his wife, Countess Anna Maria (1589–1620), a daughter of Count John VII of Nassau-Siegen and Countess Magdalene of Waldeck-Wildungen.

On 28 October 1634, he married at Waldeck Castle to his cousin Elisabeth of Waldeck.  In 1636, he inherited the County of Falkenstein from his third cousin once removed Count Francis Christopher of Daun-Oberstein.

Charles Alexander was his only son who survived into adulthood.  However, he was shot by Count Moritz of Limburg during a fight on 7 October 1659.  William Wirich remarried to Countess Agnes Catherine of Limburg-Styrum.  However, this marriage remained childless, so when he died, the Daun-Falkenstein branch died out in the male line.

The impoverished count sold the county of Falkenstein to Duke Charles IV of Lorraine in 1667.  The Lordships of Broich and Bürgel were inherited by his third cousin once remove, Emich Christian of Leiningen-Dagsburg.

Marriage and issue 
On 28 November 1634 at Waldeck Castle, he married his cousin Elizabeth (1610–1647), the daughter of Count Christian of Waldeck-Wildungen. They had the following children:
 Anna Elizabeth (9 January 1636 – 1685), married:
 in 1658 to George William (1636-1672), the son of Count Emich XIII of Leiningen-Dagsburg (1612-1658) and Christiane of Solms-Laubach (1607-1638)
 in 1673 to George Frederick, the son of Wild- and Rhinegrave John Casimir of Salm-Kyrburg (1577-1651) and Dorothea of Solms-Laubach (1579-1631)
 Ferdinand Christian (25 December 1636 – 29 March 1642)
 Charlotte Auguste (30 December 1637 – 1713)
 married Rev. A. Siebel
 Amalie Sibylle (b. 27 January 1639)
 married on 22 August 1664 (renounced 1674), John Louis (1643-1687), the son of Count Emich XIII of Leiningen-Dagsburg and Dorothea of Waldeck-Wildungen
 Christine Louise (18 July 1640 – December 1717)
 married on 17 July 1664 to Count Emich Christian (1642-1702), another son of Count Emich XIII of Leiningen-Dagsburg and Dorothea of Waldeck-Wildungen
 Charles Alexander (23 February 1643 – 7 October 1659)
 William (23 July 1644 – 4 October 1653)

In 1663, he remarried, to Agnes Catherine (1629–1686), the daughter of Count Bernard Albert of Limburg-Styrum (1597–1637) and Countess Maria Anna of Berg (1600–1653).  This marriage remained childless.

Ancestors

References 
 

Lords of Broich
1613 births
1682 deaths
Counts of Falkenstein
17th-century German people